Nathaniel Kahn (born November 9, 1962, in Philadelphia, Pennsylvania) is an American filmmaker. His documentaries My Architect (2003) – about his father, the architect Louis Kahn – and Two Hands (2006) were nominated for Academy Awards. His mother is landscape architect Harriet Pattison.

In 2018 Kahn directed the HBO documentary The Price of Everything about the exponential sums paid for works on the Contemporary art market.

Kahn is a graduate of Germantown Friends School and Yale University.

References

External links 
 The Beast: Interview with Nathaniel Kahn in Musee
 
 

1962 births
Living people
American documentary filmmakers
American documentary film directors
American people of Estonian-Jewish descent
Artists from Philadelphia
Yale University alumni
Timothy Dwight College alumni
Directors Guild of America Award winners